Roy Edward Wilson (September 13, 1896 in Foster, Iowa – December 3, 1969 in Clarion, Iowa) nicknamed "Lefty", was a professional baseball pitcher. He appeared in one game in Major League Baseball for the Chicago White Sox during the 1928 season. Wilson batted and threw left-handed.

In his lone major league appearance, Wilson pitched 3.1 innings in relief against the Cleveland Indians. He gave up three hits and two walks, but no runs, and struck out two batters.

External links

Retrosheet

Major League Baseball pitchers
Chicago White Sox players
Lincoln Links players
San Antonio Bears players
Baseball players from Iowa
1896 births
1969 deaths